Anuraga Karikkin Vellam (English: The Tender Coconut Water of Love) is a 2016 Indian Malayalam romantic comedy film directed by debutant Khalid Rahman. It stars Biju Menon,  Asif Ali, Asha Sharath and Rajisha Vijayan in lead roles. Written by Naveen Bhaskar, it revolves around the life of an ordinary man, Raghu, and his son, Abhilash. The soundtrack and background score for the film are composed by Prashant Pillai.

Produced jointly by Shaji Nadesan, Prithviraj Sukumaran, Santhosh Sivan, and Arya under the banner of August Cinema. Anuraga Karikkin Vellam was released on 7 July 2016.The performance of Rajisha Vijayan made her to win the Kerala State Film Award for Best Actress in 2016 .

Plot
Abhilash(Abi), a young architect is in search of a job. Elizabeth (Eli), his girlfriend is a sweet, bubbly and kind-hearted girl who treats Abhi like a kid. Abhi is irritated by Eli's frequent calls and interference in his life. Upon his friend's suggestions, he breaks up with Eli leaving her heartbroken. She struggles with her breakup.
Abhi's father, Raghu is a strict police officer. One day, he meets his ex-girlfriend, Anuradha and tries to contact her, but fails. Abhi gets to know this and gives a fake number to Raghu. Eli gives her own number to Raghu and pretends to be Anuradha. Raghu and Eli form a very friendly bond, she manages to make things better between Raghu and his wife, Suma. After years of marriage, Raghu and Suma get closer because of Eli.

Abhi gets a job in a call centre 
where one of his old friend, Sony also works. But Abhi finds it difficult to adjust in the call centre and leaves. Sony confesses to Abhi that he loves Eli. Sony helps Eli in coming out of the breakup and proposes to Eli. Abhi starts missing Eli, however, her marriage gets fixed with Sony.

One last time, Eli meets Abhi and tells him how important he was for her and leaves. Abhi starts realising her worth and wants her back.

Raghu wants to meet Anuradha and requests her to meet him. With no choice left, Eli meets Raghu and tells him the truth.

On the day before her wedding, Abhi decides to break Eli's wedding and bring her back, however he gets arrested and kept inside the police station. The next morning, his father releases him. He confesses to his father that he loves Eli and she will marry someone else. Raghu supports Abhi and rushes to stop the wedding, however, they fail to do so. Abhi apologizes to Eli and proposes to her. Eli, now married to Sony rejects Abhi and makes peace with him. Sony thanks Abhi.

While returning, Raghu again meets Anuradha, and this time, they chase her car. Upon asked about her, she reveals that she is not Anuradha. The movie ends with Raghu and Abhi laughing.

Cast
 Biju Menon as Raghu, a furious police officer, Abhi's father
 Asha Sarath as Suma, Raghu's wife and Abhi and Anu's mother
 Asif Ali as Abhilash (Abhi), an architect
 Rajisha Vijayan as Elizabeth (Eli), Abhi's girlfriend and later Sony's wife. 
 Sreenath Bhasi as Kichu, Abhi's friend 
 Soubin Shahir as Fakrudheen (Fakru), Abhi's friend, a bike mechanic
 Ivana as Anu, Raghu and Suma's daughter and Abhi's younger sister
 Sudheer Karamana as James, Raghu's colleague police officer
 Pauly Valsan as Corporation Cleaner 
 Naaji as Sony, An old friend of Abhi's and later Eli's husband. 
 Chinnu Chandni Nair as Jaslin
 Irshad as Irfan Khan
 Maniyanpilla Raju as Prakash Kopara, Eli's father
 Sudhi Koppa as Thanka
 Tom Alter as Abhi's boss
 V. P. Khalid as Band Mani
 Nandhini as Anuradha (cameo)
 Shaji Nadeshan as Anuradha's husband (cameo)

Soundtrack

The original soundtrack is composed, programmed, and arranged by Prashant Pillai. The soundtrack was made available for digital sale from 1 July 2016.

Release
Anuraga Karikkin Vellam released in India on 7 July 2016 on the occasion of Eid, in 74 screens across Kerala along with Kasaba at the box office.

Reception

Accolades

Critical response
International Business Times called it a "sweet family entertainer". The Times of India said, "On the whole, it's one of those cute family movies packed with a basket-full of laughter, emotions, and thoughts that you can give in to, without a second thought.

Box office

Domestic
Anuraga Karikkin Vellam grossed more than 16 crore from the multiplexes of Ernakulam district in 5 days. Among the Eid releases, Anuraga Karikkin Vellam, emerged as the top grosser at the Cochin multiplexes.

References

External links
 
 

2010s Malayalam-language films
Films shot in Kochi
Films directed by Khalid Rahman